Et tu, Brute? is a Latin-language phrase and quote from William Shakespeare's play Julius Caesar.

Et Tu Brute or variations, may also refer to:

Music
 Et tu Brute?, former name of 2001 album Box Car Racer (album) by the band Box Car Racer
 Et Tu Brute, a 2007 album by Theo Parrish
 Et Tu, Brute? (EP), a 2014 record by the Red Jumpsuit Apparatus
 "Et Tu Brute", a song by Joe Beagle
 "Et Tu Brute?", a 1995 song by CIV from the album Set Your Goals (album)
 "Et Tu, Bruté?", a 1997 song by Chris Potter from the album Unspoken (Chris Potter album)

Television
 "Et Tu, Brute", a 1991 episode of Shark in the Park
 "Et Tu, Brute?", a 2015 episode of Empire (season 2)

Other uses
 Et tu, Brute? – The Murder of Caesar and Political Assassination, a 2006 non-fiction book by Greg Woolf
  Et tu Brute, a painting by William Holmes Sullivan, a variation on the painting The Assassination of Julius Caesar (Sullivan)

See also

 Last words of Julius Caesar
 List of last words